The Memphis Browns were a minor league baseball team from Memphis, Tennessee, that played in the Class B Southern League in 1887. The team, one of only three out of seven teams still playing at the end of the season, finished the season in third place with a 65–46 (.386) record.

See also
Memphis Browns players

References 

Southern League (1885–1899) teams
Baseball teams established in 1887
Baseball teams disestablished in 1887
B
Professional baseball teams in Tennessee
1887 establishments in Tennessee
1887 disestablishments in Tennessee
Defunct baseball teams in Tennessee